Eddie Sutter is a former professional American football player who played linebacker for five seasons for the Cleveland Browns, Baltimore Ravens, and Atlanta Falcons.

References

1969 births
American football linebackers
Cleveland Browns players
Baltimore Ravens players
Atlanta Falcons players
Northwestern Wildcats football players
Living people